Kundur is a rural locality (a selo) and the administrative center of Kundursky Selsoviet of Arkharinsky District, Amur Oblast, Russia. The population was 693 as of 2018. There are 27 streets.

Geography 
Kundur is located on the Trans-Siberian Railway, 75 km southeast of Arkhara (the district's administrative centre) by road. Tonnelny is the nearest rural locality.

References 

Rural localities in Arkharinsky District